Christoph Nunatak is a nunatak rising to about ,  east-northeast of Holtet Nunatak in the Lyon Nunataks. It was mapped by the United States Geological Survey from U.S. Navy aerial photographs taken 1965–68 and Landsat imagery taken 1973–74. It was named by the Advisory Committee on Antarctic Names in 1987 after Klaus J. Christoph, upper atmospheric physicist at Siple Station, 1970–71.

References 

Nunataks of Palmer Land